Version intégrale is the sixth studio album by Canadian singer Garou, and his seventh album overall.

Track list
"J'avais besoin d'être là" — 3:57 (Jacques Veneruso)
"Version intégrale" — 3:37 (Marc Dupré)
"Je resterai le même" — 4:46 (Iren Bo, Patrick Hampartzoumian)
"Si tu veux que je ne t'aime plus" — 2:36 (François Welgryn, Davide Esposito)
"For You" — 3:29 (Jean-Jacques Goldman, Garou, Carole Fredericks, Jacques Veneruso)
"Salutations distinguées" — 4:45 (Pascal Obispo)
"Je l'aime encore" — 4:20 (Félix Gray)
"Bonne espérance" — 4:00 (Mike Ibrahim)
"Mise à jour" — 3:40 (Garou)
"Un nouveau monde" — 3:53 (Jacques Veneruso)
"Passagers que nous sommes" — 3:17 (Marie Bastide)
"T'es là" — 3:23 (Garou)
"La scène" — 3:23

Charts

References

2010 albums
Garou (singer) albums